The Maybes? were an English indie rock band from Liverpool. The group was made up of four principal members: Nick Ellis, Lee Smith, Timo Tierney and Dominic Allen. They had been performing since 2002, and in early 2006 they were signed to Xtra Mile Recordings. The band disbanded in 2009.

Background
All the members of the band are from the Anfield and Kensington districts of Liverpool, and were close friends before the band started. They attended Liverpool Community College. They have been performing gigs since 2002, supporting other bands as well as their own shows. They are well known in Liverpool for their band name being spray painted in many places.

In 2006, The Maybes? signed their first deal with London-based record label, Xtra Mile Recordings. The label released The Maybes?' first record, "Stop, Look & Listen", on a split 7" vinyl with DARTZ! in January 2006 (as part of the Xtra Mile Single Sessions) and went on to sign the band. They also brought out "Olympia" their debut EP, in October 2006.

The band were one of the headline acts at the Liverpool Mathew Street Music Festival in 2006, and again in 2007, when they also appeared at the Knowsley Hall Music Festival. They started recording their album in late 2007 and when they had finished recording in early 2008, they set about touring Britain again and playing for local and national radio shows. It was around the same time their second single "Talk About You" was released on download. In April 2008, they launched their own club night at Nation, the home of Cream, called Sonic Temple and in the summer of 2008, the band played some of the big music festivals such as the V Festival, Isle of Wight Festival and Reading and Leeds Festival, as well as seeing the release of their debut album Promise, and singles "Boys" and "Summertime".

The single "Promise" is also used as the theme song for the 2010 Friends Provident t20 cricket competition in England and Wales. The track is played when the teams take to the field at the start of the game and is played during the hand shakes.

Discography

Albums
Promise
The Love Story (2010)

EPs
"Olympia'"

Singles

See also
Xtra Mile Recordings

References

External links
YouTube
Promise Review Daily Music Guide

English rock music groups
Musical groups from Liverpool